Carboxypeptidase A6 (CPA6) is a metallocarboxypeptidase enzyme that in humans is encoded by the CPA6 gene. It is highly expressed in the adult mouse olfactory bulb and is broadly expressed in the embryonic brain and other tissues.

The protein encoded by this gene belongs to the family of carboxypeptidases, which catalyze the release of C-terminal amino acid, and have functions ranging from digestion of food to selective biosynthesis of neuroendocrine peptides. Polymorphic variants and a reciprocal translocation t(6;8)(q26;q13) involving this gene, have been associated with Duane retraction syndrome.

CPA6 processes several neuropeptides, including [Met]- and [Leu]-enkephalin, angiotensin I, and neurotensin in vitro. Whereas CPA6 is capable of converting the enkephalins and neurotensin into inactive forms, it can convert the inactive angiotensin I into the active angiotensin II.  CPA6 may have additional roles in processing peptides and proteins in vivo, but the nature of these substrates and the effects of these cleavages are currently unknown.

See also 
 Carboxypeptidase A inhibitor
 Carboxypeptidase

References

Further reading

External links 
 

Proteins
Enzymes
Metabolism